Pleurotomella petiti is a species of sea snail, a marine gastropod mollusk in the family Raphitomidae.

Description

Distribution
This species occurs in Antarctic waters.

References

Further reading

petiti
Gastropods described in 2016